Ramona S. Diaz is a Filipino-American documentary filmmaker best known for creating "character-driven documentaries". Her notable works include the 2012 film Don't Stop Believin': Everyman's Journey, featuring the band Journey and its new lead vocalist Arnel Pineda, which won the Audience Award for the 2013–2014 season of PBS's Independent Lens; and the 2003 film Imelda, about the life of Imelda Marcos, former First Lady of the Philippines.

Three of Diaz's films have screened at The Sundance Film Festival: Imelda, a biographical documentary about Imelda's beginnings as a beauty contest winner to the wife of rising politician and eventual President of the Philippines, Ferdinand Marcos. Motherland, a documentary set at an overcrowded and under-resourced maternity hospital in Manila; and most recently A Thousand Cuts a profile of Nobel laureate Maria Ressa, a journalist working in the Philippines, released in 2020. Motherland received a Special Jury Award at Sundance in 2017 and premiered the same year at the Berlin International Film Festival.

In 2019 Diaz received a United States Artists (USA) Fellowship.

Filmography 

 1997 Spirits Rising
 2003 Imelda
 2011 Give Up Tomorrow' (as Executive Producer)
 2011 The Learning (episode in P.O.V.)
 2013 Don't Stop Believin': Everyman's Journey (episode in Independent Lens)
 2017 Motherland 2020 A Thousand Cuts''

Awards

References

1962 births
Living people
American documentary filmmakers
American people of Filipino descent